Razafimandimbisonia is a genus of flowering plants in the family Rubiaceae. It is endemic to Madagascar.

Taxonomy
The genus Alberta was shown to be paraphyletic in a phylogenetic analysis of the tribe Alberteae. The type species Alberta magna is set apart from the Malagasy Alberta species. A new genus, Razafimandimbisonia, was proposed to accommodate these Malagasy species. It is named in honour of the botanist Sylvain G. Razafimandimbison.

Species
Razafimandimbisonia humblotii (Drake) Kainul. & B.Bremer
Razafimandimbisonia minor (Baill.) Kainul. & B.Bremer
Razafimandimbisonia orientalis (Homolle ex Cavaco) Kainul. & B.Bremer
Razafimandimbisonia regalis (Puff & Robbr.) Kainul. & B.Bremer
Razafimandimbisonia sambiranensis (Homolle ex Cavaco) Kainul. & B.Bremer

References

External links
World Checklist of Rubiaceae

Rubiaceae genera
Alberteae
Taxa named by Birgitta Bremer